The Paterson Panthers name was also used for a team in the American Association (football).

The Paterson Panthers were an American basketball team based in the Paterson, New Jersey that was a member of the American Basketball League.

During the 1st half of their only season, the team became the Trenton Bengals on December 13, 1935.

Year-by-year

Sports in Paterson, New Jersey
Basketball teams in New Jersey